USS Ashland may refer to the following ships of the United States Navy:

 , a dock landing ship, launched in 1942 and struck in 1969.

United States Navy ship names